The Worst Week of My Life is a 2011 Italian comedy film directed by Alessandro Genovesi. It is based on the British sitcom of the same name.

Plot
Paolo is an advertising agent of Milan who is madly in love with the rich Margherita, of a wealthy family. The two decide to get married, and a week before the wedding, Paolo is invited by the parents and relatives of Margherita. They just want to know Paolo, as Margherita has spoken so highly of him; Paolo, however, proves to be very clumsy and awkward, resulting in catastrophic and extremely embarrassing situations. The troubles in the family also increases when Ivano, the best man of Paolo, comes at the parental home of Margherita.

Cast
 Fabio De Luigi as Paolo
 Cristiana Capotondi as Margherita 
 Monica Guerritore as Clara
 Antonio Catania as Giorgio
 Alessandro Siani as Ivano
 Gisella Sofio as the grandmother
 Nadir Caselli as Ginevra
 Chiara Francini as Simona
 Andrea Mingardi as Dino, Paolo's father
 Arisa as Martina

See also   
 List of Italian films of 2011

References

External links
 

2011 films
2011 comedy films
Italian comedy films
2010s Italian-language films
Films set in Milan
Films based on television series
Films directed by Alessandro Genovesi
2010s Italian films